The BMW Charity Pro-Am is a golf tournament on the Korn Ferry Tour. It is currently played at Thornblade Club (host course) in Greer, South Carolina and The Carolina Country Club in Spartanburg, South Carolina.

From 1992 to 2000, the event was played at Verdae Greens Golf Club in Greenville.

When the event changed to a pro-am format in 2001, it moved to The Cliffs in Travelers Rest, South Carolina, using the Valley and Keowee Vineyards courses. The Walnut Cove course was added in 2005. In 2008, the tournament shifted to three different courses: Thornblade Club, Carolina Country Club in Spartanburg, South Carolina and Bright's Creek Golf Club in Mill Spring, North Carolina. In 2012, the Greenville Country Club (Chanticleer course) replaced Bright's Creek.

The 2017 purse was $700,000, with $126,000 going to champion Stephan Jäger. Since 2002, the tournament has been sponsored by German car manufacturer BMW, which has an assembly plant in Spartanburg County.

Courses

Winners

Bolded golfers graduated to the PGA Tour via the Korn Ferry Tour regular-season money list. Golfers in bold italics achieved their third win of the season at this tournament and were promoted immediately.

Notes

References

External links

Coverage on the Korn Ferry Tour's official site

Korn Ferry Tour events
Golf in South Carolina
Golf in North Carolina
Recurring sporting events established in 1992
Pro–am golf tournaments
1992 establishments in South Carolina